Pselnophorus emeishanensis is a moth of the family Pterophoridae that is found in Sichuan province of China.

References

Moths described in 2002
Oidaematophorini
Endemic fauna of Sichuan
Moths of Asia